KKOY (1460 AM) is a radio station broadcasting a country music format. Licensed to Chanute, Kansas, United States, it serves the Pittsburg area. The station is owned by My Town Media Inc.

References

Previous logo

External links
KKOY 1460 Facebook

KOY
Country radio stations in the United States